Mahiabad may refer to:
 Mahiabad, East Azerbaijan
 Mahiabad, South Khorasan